Sivtsevo is a rural locality (a village) in Gorodetskoye Rural Settlement, Kichmengsko-Gorodetsky District, Vologda Oblast, Russia. The population was 9 as of 2002.

Geography 
Sivtsevo is located 52 km northwest of Kichmengsky Gorodok (the district's administrative centre) by road. Brod is the nearest rural locality.

References 

Rural localities in Kichmengsko-Gorodetsky District